Ernie Zeller (September 1, 1909 – July 16, 1987) was an American gridiron football player.  He spent two seasons as a tackle in the Canadian Football League.

Zeller played college football at Indiana State.  He also wrestled for the Sycamores, though Indiana State did not have a wrestling team.  He participated in the 1932 and 1933 NCAA Championships, finishing third in 1933.   He competed in the 1932 U.S. Olympic Trials, winning three matches, advancing to the national Finals.

Zeller was signed by the Crosse & Blackwell Chefs as an undrafted free agent in 1934 and played one season there.  In his second season, he signed with Toronto; they finished second in their division in the 46th CFL season.   During this time, he also wrestled professionally across Canada and the United States.

Following his professional career, Zeller returned to the United States and began a career in education, coaching and officiating; he was the head coach at Robinson High, leading the Maroons to a conference title in 1941.

Zeller was drafted by the United States Navy in 1942 and spent the next four years in uniform; following the war, he returned to his teaching career.  He served as the superintendent of the Butler, Indiana schools from 1951 to 1966 and as the vice president of the International Junior College in Fort Wayne, Indiana from 1966 to 1971.

References

1909 births
1987 deaths
American male sport wrestlers
American players of Canadian football
Canadian football defensive linemen
Indiana State Sycamores football players
Indiana State Sycamores wrestlers
Toronto Argonauts players
High school football coaches in Illinois
People from Terre Haute, Indiana
Players of American football from Indiana